Cultus Lake is a lake, associated community and provincial park in the Fraser Valley region of British Columbia, Canada. It is the source of the Sweltzer River. In 1950, Cultus Lake became a provincial park of British Columbia. Cultus Lake covers an area of 656 hectares, evenly on either side of the lake. At one time the lake had a sawmill and booming ground until it became a provincial park in the 1950s.

Etymology 
Cultus Lake has always been an important place for spirit quests of the Sto:lo people. However, it was named with the Chinook Jargon word meaning primarily bad,<ref>{{Cite web |url=http://www.cayoosh.net/hiyu/adject.html#engl |title=Chinook Jargon Phrasebook: Adverbs & Adjectives |access-date=2010-03-31 |archive-url=https://web.archive.org/web/20110514064756/http://www.cayoosh.net/hiyu/adject.html#engl |archive-date=2011-05-14 |url-status=dead }}</ref> worthless, or good for nothing, though the same word can also mean free, without purpose, or simply nothing''.

Climate

Recreation

Accommodations 
British Columbia Parks has several camping sites in the area in addition to a few privately owned campgrounds.

Cultus Lake Waterpark 
The Cultus Lake water park includes picnic areas, concession stands such as Pier 84' Fish and Chips, Burger Stop, Pizza 2 Go, Candy Shop, Sub shop and an Espresso Hut, a rentals booth which includes lockers, BBQs, umbrellas and loungers, and paid WiFi ($2/day). Their official website is www.cultus.com.

The waterslides at the facilities include:

 Blasters n' Twisters 1989
 Radical Rapids 1988
 Valley of Fear 1997
 Free Fall 1988
 Speed Slide 1988
 Colossal Canyon 2009
 Zero-60 Raceway 2009
 Pool with a clockwise current called the Adventure River 2003
 Tubular Terror 2012
 Bazooka Bowls 2013 
 Boomerang 2013
 Rattler 2016
 5 hot tubs located throughout the park

Note: The park also has smaller slides and areas for smaller children such as 
 Pirates Cove
 Kiddie Castle 
 Turtle Slide and Pool

They also offer life jackets for free.

Cultus Lake Adventure Park 

Cultus Lake Adventure Park opened in July 2014 as the expansion of Giggle Ridge Adventure Golf adding 11 rides. After a multi phase expansion Cultus Lake Adventure Park now offers more than 18 rides and attractions.

Amusement rides include:

 Buckin' Bronco 
 Classic Carousel 
 Wagon Wheel – giant ferris wheel
 Bucky's Bumper Boats
 Balloon Adventure
 Wilderness Trail – kiddie playground with caves, streams, rope bridges, tree forts and panning for gems station
 Round Up 360 – Canada's only 360 pendulum ride 
 Runaway Mine Train – rollercoaster
 Blastin' Barrels
 Windmill Drop 
 Wave Swinger Ride
 Ribbit
 Honey Pots
 Cloud Buster - 120 ft. free fall

Government 
The Cultus Lake Parks Board includes five commissioners, of whom 3 are elected from Cultus Lake, and 2 from the City of Chilliwack (as of 2017, Darcy Bauer and David Renwick). During the early 1900s, the Cultus Lake area began to build its popularity, which then led to the formation of a joint committee between Cultus Lake and the City of Chilliwack in 1924. This then led to the formation of the Cultus Lake Park Board in 1932, which is still in effect today. As of 2014, the board chairman is David Renwick.

Education 
Cultus Lake Community School has approximately 150 students from Kindergarten to Grade 6. The school was first opened in 1947 as a three-room schoolhouse. It was destroyed by fire in February 1959; the current building opened in October of the same year. The school is administered by the Chilliwack School District.

References

External links 
 Cultus Lake Park community web site
 Cultus Lake Waterpark homepage
 Cultus Lake Golf Club homepage
 Cultus Lake Adventure Park  Homepage
BC Parks webpage
Fish species in Cultus Lake

1950 establishments in British Columbia
Canadian Cascades
Chinook Jargon place names
Lakes of the Lower Mainland
Neighbourhoods in Chilliwack
Populated places in the Fraser Valley Regional District
Protected areas established in 1950
Provincial parks of British Columbia
Unincorporated settlements in British Columbia
Water parks in Canada